This is a record of Italy's results at the FIFA World Cup. Italy is one of the most successful national teams in the history of the World Cup, having won four titles (1934, 1938, 1982, 2006), just one fewer than Brazil, but last qualified for the event in 2014. The team was present in 18 out of the 22 tournaments, reaching six finals, a third place and a fourth place.

Overall record
 Champions   Runners-up   Third Place   Fourth Place  

*Draws include knockout matches decided via penalty shoot-out

Finals

By Match
Italy's score listed first

Record by Opponent

World Cup Finals

1934 World Cup Final v Czechoslovakia

With temperatures around 40 °C (104 °F), Italy won their home tournament in 1934 after going into extra time against Czechoslovakia.

1938 World Cup Final v Hungary

After a difficult route to the final, defeating hosts France in the quarter-finals and Brazil in the semis, Italy was the first team to win the World Cup title on foreign ground. Also, it was the first of only two times in World Cup history that a team successfully defended their title.

1970 World Cup Final v Brazil

In 1970, the Brazilian team featured superstars like Pelé, Rivelino, Jairzinho and Carlos Alberto and were considered favourites for the title. Particularly in the second half, the Italians were outclassed by the Brazilians passing play.

1982 World Cup Final v West Germany

Italy played three draws in the first group stage in a worrisome start to the tournament, proceeding ahead of Cameroon only on number of goals scored. However, the Italians continued to defeat Brazil, Argentina and a strong Polish side over the course of the tournament and faced West Germany in the final in Madrid.

Antonio Cabrini missed a penalty in the goalless first half, but the dominant Italian side eventually built up a 3–0 lead and won by 3–1 in the end, securing their third World Cup trophy.

1994 World Cup Final v Brazil

The 1994 final was the first ever to be decided on penalties after goalless 120 minutes. Italian captain Franco Baresi missed the very first penalty, and Roberto Baggio the decisive last one.

Italy became the first team to lose two World Cup finals against the same opponent.

2006 World Cup Final v France

Italian defender Marco Materazzi was involved in all three outstanding moments of the first 120 minutes: He conceded the penalty that was converted by Zinedine Zidane early in the game, equalised with a powerful header soon after, and provoked Zidane in a manner that lead to the French captain being sent off. He also scored in the penalty-shootout that was to follow.

It was only the second time a World Cup final was decided on penalties, again involving Italy after the 1994 final lost to Brazil.

Player records

Most appearances
Paolo Maldini is the player with the fourth-most matches at FIFA World Cups, trailing only behind the Argentinian Lionel Messi (26) and the Germans Lothar Matthäus (25) and Miroslav Klose (24). This also makes him the player with the most World Cup matches without winning the trophy.

Goalkeeper Gianluigi Buffon is the only Italian player, and one of only three in the world, who have been part of five FIFA World Cup squads.

Top goalscorers
Two Italians were awarded the Golden Boot for best goalscorer at a FIFA World Cup: Paolo Rossi in 1982 and Salvatore Schillaci in 1990 with 6 goals each.

Awards and Records

Team Awards

 World Champions 1934
 World Champions 1938
 World Champions 1982
 World Champions 2006
 Second Place 1970
 Second Place 1994
 Third Place 1990

Individual Awards

Golden Ball award

 Golden Ball 1934: Giuseppe Meazza
 Golden Ball 1982: Paolo Rossi
 Golden Ball 1990: Salvatore Schillaci
 Silver Ball 1938: Silvio Piola
 Silver Ball 1978: Paolo Rossi
 Silver Ball 1994: Roberto Baggio
 Silver Ball 2006: Fabio Cannavaro
 Bronze Ball 2006: Andrea Pirlo

Golden Boot award

 Golden Boot 1982: Paolo Rossi
 Golden Boot 1990: Salvatore Schillaci
 Silver Boot 1934: Angelo Schiavio
 Silver Boot 1938: Silvio Piola
 Silver Boot 1998: Christian Vieri

Other individual awards

 Golden Glove 1982: Dino Zoff (oldest Golden Glove winner)
 Golden Glove 2006: Gianluigi Buffon
 Best Young Player Award 1978: Antonio Cabrini
 Man of the Match Award 2006: Andrea Pirlo

Refereeing

Three World Cup finals have been officiated by representatives of the Italian football federation, only English referees have had the honour more often (four times). The 1978 final between Argentina and the Netherlands has been led by Sergio Gonella, who had already officiated the European Championship final two years earlier. The other referees are Pierluigi Collina in 2002, and Nicola Rizzoli in 2014.

The Italian referee with the most World Cup matches, however, is Roberto Rosetti, who has been in charge of six matches total in 2006 and 2010.

See also
Italy at the UEFA European Championship

References

External links 
 Italian Football Federation official website
 FIFA Official Ranking of all Participants at Finals 1930–2002. FIFA Match Results for all Stages 1930–2002
 FIFA official site

 
Countries at the FIFA World Cup